The 1947 UCLA Bruins football team was an American football team that represented the University of California, Los Angeles during the 1947 college football season. In their third year under head coach Bert LaBrucherie, the Bruins compiled a 5–4 record (4–2 conference) and finished in fourth place in the Pacific Coast Conference.

Schedule

References

UCLA
UCLA Bruins football seasons
UCLA Bruins football
UCLA Bruins football